Bryan Independent School District is a public school district based in Bryan, Texas (USA). It also serves rural areas in northern Brazos County, and a small portion of Robertson County.

Within Brazos County it includes Bryan, Kurten, Lake Bryan, Wixon Valley, and small portions of College Station.

In 2009 the school district was rated "academically acceptable" by the Texas Education Agency.

High schools
Mary Catherine Harris School of Choice
Bryan Collegiate High School
James Earl Rudder High School
Bryan High School, established 1971; superseded Stephen F. Austin High School (now middle school)

Middle schools
Arthur L. Davila Middle School
Sam Rayburn Intermediate  School
Jane Long Intermediate  School
Stephen F. Austin Middle School - (Formerly Stephen F. Austin High School)

Elementary schools
Bonham Elementary School
Bowen Elementary School (2000-01 National Blue Ribbon School)
Mary Branch Elementary School
Carver Early Childhood School - Pre-K
Crockett Elementary School
Fannin Elementary School
Henderson Elementary School
Houston Elementary School
Johnson Elementary School (National Blue Ribbon School in 1998-99  and 2007-2010 )
Anson Jones Elementary School
Kemp Carver Elementary School (Formerly E.A. Kemp High School)
Harvey Mitchell Elementary School
Navarro Elementary School
Robert C. Neal Elementary School
Sul Ross Elementary School

See also

Texas Education Agency

References

External links

TEA report for Bryan ISD

School districts in Brazos County, Texas
School districts in Robertson County, Texas
Bryan, Texas
College Station, Texas